Carine is a village in the municipality of Nikšić, Montenegro. It is located close to the Bosnian border.

Demographics
According to the 2011 census, its population was 187.

References

Populated places in Nikšić Municipality
Serb communities in Montenegro